Castles in Spain is a 1920 British silent drama film directed by Horace Lisle Lucoque and starring C. Aubrey Smith, Lilian Braithwaite and Hayford Hobbs. It was based on the 1912 novel Castles in Spain by Ruby M. Ayres. It was made at Kew Studios in London. A man retires to a country village, where he meets the woman of his dreams. However, he soon discovers that his nephew has also fallen in love with her.

Cast
 C. Aubrey Smith as The builder 
 Lilian Braithwaite as Elizabeth Cherry 
 Bertie Gordon as Rachael 
 Hayford Hobbs as Roger Welchman 
 Maud Yates as Gwendolyn Welchman 
 Charles Vane as The lame man 
 R. Heaton Grey as George Henson 
 Jeff Barlow as The lavender man 
 May Lind as Diana Wynne

References

Bibliography
 Bamford, Kentom. Distorted Images: British National Identity and Film in the 1920s. I.B. Tauris, 1999.
 Low, Rachael. History of the British Film, 1918-1929. George Allen & Unwin, 1971.
 Warren, Patricia. British Film Studios: An Illustrated History. Batsford, 2001.

External links

1920 films
1920 drama films
British drama films
British silent feature films
Films based on British novels
Films set in England
British black-and-white films
1920s English-language films
1920s British films
Silent drama films